Brain Boy was a short-lived superhero comic, created by Herb Castle and artist Gil Kane, published by Dell Comics in 1962 and 1963.

Fictional character biography 
Brain Boy was Matt Price. When his mother was still pregnant with him, a car accident with an electrical tower killed his father and gave Matt mental powers. These powers included telepathy, levitation, and the ability to control minds. After graduating from high school, Matt is recruited by another telepath to work for a secret government agency fighting against communists and other "enemies of freedom" using their own telepathic agents against the West. "Brain Boy" was just Matt's nickname, and he never wore a costume.

Publication history 
The first issue was Four Color Comics #1330 in 1962, followed by Brain Boy #2.  The last issue was #6 in 1963. Frank Springer took over the artwork for the spin-off series.

Other versions 
Brain Boy was mentioned, along with other superheroes such as Black Cat and the Golden Age Crimson Avenger, in Alan Moore's The League of Extraordinary Gentlemen: Black Dossier.

Dark Horse Comics released a hardcover archive collection at the end of 2011. Dark Horse Comics rebooted the character for their superhero line, along with Captain Midnight, Catalyst, and X. The series is written by Fred Van Lente, with art by R. B. Silva, Rob Lean, Ego, and cover art by Ariel Olivetti. The first issue was published on September 11, 2013.

External links
Brain Boy's entry at International Catalog of Superheroes
Brain Boy at Don Markstein's Toonopedia. Archived from the original on February 22, 2018.
Review of BB #6

References

Comics characters introduced in 1962
Dell Comics titles